Garra dembeensis, the Dembea stone lapper, is a small African species of ray-finned fish in the family Cyprinidae. It occurs in fast-flowing sections of rivers and wave-washed shores of lakes in the Nile system and other freshwater systems in East and Central Africa, although its presence in the Congo River basin is uncertain.

References 

Garra
Fish described in 1835